The 1999 Croatian Indoors was a men's tennis tournament played on indoor carpet courts in Copenhagen, Denmark, that was part of the International Series of the 1999 ATP Tour. It was the twelfth edition of the tournament and was held from 2 February until 9 February 1998.

Seeds
Champion seeds are indicated in bold text while text in italics indicates the round in which those seeds were eliminated.

Draw

Finals

Top half

Bottom half

References

External links
 https://www.atptour.com/en/scores/archive/copenhagen/481/1999/draws?matchtype=singles Main draw]

1999 ATP Tour
1999 Copenhagen Open – 1